Thurinjikuppam Thiruvannamalai District, Tamil Nadu, India, is located in the Polur Taluk, which belongs to the Arani Revenue Division.  The famous Adiparasakthi Amman Temple is located here.

Population 

According to the 2011 census of India, the total population is 2993.  Of these, 1343 are women and 1404 are men.  Thurinjikuppam Village, with a population of 2993, is the 36th most populous village in the Polur Taluk, which is the  India's Tamil Nadu Thiruvannamalai District Polur The circle is located in the Polur circle.  The total geographical area of Thurinjikuppam village is 7 km2, which is the 26th largest village in the sub-district.  The population density of the village is 417 persons per km2.  This panchayat is also included in the Polur assembly constituency & Arani Lok sabha constituency.

Road & transport facilities 

Thurinjikuppam village is set up as a network of facilities.

 Periyeri - Sitteri - Thurinjikuppam - kelur - vadamathimangalam Road
 Thurinjikuppam - vilankuppam - munivantangal Road
 Thurinjikuppam - Athuvambadi - kattippoondi - Polur road
 There is a city bus service from Arani (Track Number: 6A LSS), via: Kelur, Vadamathimangalam Railway Station, and Kalambur.
 There are regular bus services from Avalurpet, Devikapuram, Polur, Kunnathoor and Kattipoondi (City Number: P2 LSS).

References

 http://thuvinjikuppam.wordpress.com

Villages in Tiruvannamalai district
Cities and towns in Tiruvannamalai district